Marly de Pádua Macieira Sarney (born 4 December 1932) is the wife of the former president of Brazil José Sarney. She was First Lady of Brazil during the presidency of her husband, between 1985 and 1990.

Biography 
Sarney married José Sarney on 12 July 1952.

References  

1932 births
People from São Luís, Maranhão
Brazilian Democratic Movement politicians
First ladies of Brazil
Second ladies of Brazil
Democratic Social Party politicians
Living people